Ivan Iosifovich Sergeychik (June 6, 1906 – April 6, 1973) was a Belarusian Soviet NKVD-official and military commander.

History
From November 1931 through March 1935 he worked for the State Political Directorate(OGPU) and from March 1935 through November 1937 he worked as special prosecutor for NKVD in Minsk, Belarus.

World War II
Shortly after the outbreak of World War II on the Eastern Front, Belarus got heavily engaged in Soviet partisan warfare. 

In September 1942, Ivan Sergeychik was parachuted into the forest somewhere in the region of Bogushevsk, Vitsebsk voblast and as a political commissar joined Sozonov Detachment #41 that was a part of the 1st Vitsebsk Partisan Brigade.
To document his activity he kept a diary. His diary covered a period between 19 September 1942 and 27 July 1943. Throughout this period, his detachment actively participated in various diversions including placing improvised explosive devices along the roads and railroads; ambushed individual German units and involved in direct battles with regular German army. As a result of the direct confrontations with the German troops, 376 German soldiers and officers were killed and 314 were wounded. Throughout this period, the placement of the IEDs along the railroad tracks destroyed nine train engines, destroyed and damaged 135 cars with hundreds of German troops, heavy equipment and supplies. The detachment destroyed about half mile of railroad tracks and created transportation delays on the Smolensk line for 108 hours total. The detachment routinely destroyed communication lines and telephone poles.

Exit
Because of a malaria outbreak, in July 1943 Ivan Sergeychik was evacuated to Moscow and after his recovery he resumed his duties working for NKVD. He was awarded multiple Soviet awards for his participation in the partisan campaign, including the Medal "Partisan of the Patriotic War" 2nd class and the Medal "For the Victory over Germany in the Great Patriotic War 1941–1945".

1906 births
1973 deaths
Soviet military personnel
NKVD officers
Belarusian partisans
Soviet partisans